LaShonda Katrice Barnett is an American author, playwright, and former radio host. She has published short stories, edited books on African-American music, and written a trilogy of full-length plays.

Her 2015 debut novel Jam on the Vine received a Stonewall Book Award by the American Library Association (2016). The novel courses the life of African American journalist Ivoe Williams. The book was named a finalist in the lesbian fiction category at the 2016 Lambda Literary Awards.

Barnett's short fiction appears in numerous anthologies and in literary journals such as The Chicago Tribune's Printer's Row, Callaloo, Gemini Magazine, Guernica Magazine, S/N Review, The New Orleans Review, Foglilfter Journal, the Peacock Journal, and Amherst College's Common Literary Magazine, among other publications.

Biography 
LaShonda Katrice Barnett was born in Kansas City, Missouri in 1974. She grew up, one of five children, in Park Forest, Illinois.

Barnett received a B.A. in English Language and Literature and Linguistics (with language specialization in German and Russian) from the University of Missouri and an M.A. in Women's History from Sarah Lawrence College. She earned a Ph.D. in American Studies from the College of William & Mary. Barnett has been a member of Alpha Kappa Alpha sorority since 1994. She lives in Chicago.

She has held residencies at the Noepe Center for Literary Arts-Martha's Vineyard, the Sewanee Writers’ Conference, and the Fine Arts Work Center. In 2015, she was twice nominated for the Pushcart Prize. She has taught at Columbia University, Sarah Lawrence College, Brown University, Northwestern University and Syracuse University on history and literature of the African diaspora and Women's Studies. A lover and scholar of black music, especially jazz, she hosted her own jazz program, Mapping Jazz, for WBAI (99.5 FM, NYC).

In 2007, Barnett's personal interviews on creative process with women musicians resulted in the book I Got Thunder: Black Women Songwriters On Their Craft and Off The Record: Conversations With African American & Brazilian Women Musicians in 2015.

Barnett has received grants for her work from the Rhode Island State Council on the Arts and the National Endowment for the Humanities; and awards from the New York Money for Women/Barbara Deming Memorial Fund, and the College Language Association (for best short fiction).

Works

Books 
LaShonda K. Barnett, (ed.) I Got Thunder: Black Women Songwriters on Their Craft, Thunder's Mouth Press, 2007, 
Off the Record: Conversations with African American and Brazilian Women Musicians, Scarecrow Press, Incorporated, 2012, 

Callaloo and Other Lesbian Love Tales.  New Victoria Publishers.  October 1999 .

Short stories 
 "Callaloo" (2007)
 "Dear, dear Shay" (2012)
 "Road to Wingo" (2013)
 "Courage, Meine Freundin" (2013)
 "Hen's Teeth" (2013)
 "533" (2013)
 "Broken Shoes For Walking (Wings That Never Fit)" (2014)
 "Ezekiel Saw the Wheel" (2014)
 "Graf" (2014)
 "Waltz Me Once Again" (2015)
"You're the Sweetest One" (2017)

See also 
 American literature
 African American literature

References

External links 
 Barnett on "Jam! On the Vine"
 Library Journal Q & A
 The Rumpus interview with Barnett

1974 births
21st-century American novelists
21st-century American short story writers
21st-century American women writers
African-American novelists
American feminist writers
American radio personalities
American women novelists
American women short story writers
LGBT African Americans
LGBT people from Missouri
American LGBT writers
Living people
Writers from Kansas City, Missouri
Novelists from Missouri
21st-century African-American women writers
21st-century African-American writers
20th-century African-American people
20th-century African-American women